Eivor Berglund (born 22 September 1935) is a Swedish alpine skier. She competed in three events at the 1956 Winter Olympics.

References

External links
 

1935 births
Living people
Swedish female alpine skiers
Olympic alpine skiers of Sweden
Alpine skiers at the 1956 Winter Olympics
People from Kramfors Municipality
Sportspeople from Västernorrland County
20th-century Swedish women